Motutieke Island is the largest of the many low-lying marshy islands in the delta of the Waikato River, New Zealand's longest river. The main body of the Waikato River flows to the southeast of the island, with narrow channels separating it to the north from the mainland of New Zealand's North Island. The smaller Puehunui Island lies close to the northwest.

A few small properties dot the northeastern shore of Motutieke, accessible primarily by boat.

References

Islands of Waikato
River islands of New Zealand
Waikato River
Waikato District